Fáfnir is a worm in Germanic folklore who is killed by a member of the Völsung family.

Fafnir or Fafner may also refer to:
 Bramo 323 Fafnir, a German radial piston aero-engine
 Fafnir (automobile), a German car and motor cycle manufacturer
 Fafnir (journal), a Nordic Journal of Science Fiction and Fantasy Research
 Fafnir (Marvel Comics), an Asgardian monster and foe of the Thunder God Thor
 Fafner in the Azure, a Japanese anime series
 RRG Fafnir, a German pre-WW II high-performance glider
 RRG Fafnir 2, a single seat German high performance glider
 Fafnir, a planet in Larry Niven's Known Space universe
 Fighting Fefnir, a character in the Mega Man Zero series
 Fafnir, the star 42 Draconis
 Fafner (typeface) a typeface cut by Schelter & Giesecke Type Foundry in 1905 and revived by Oliver Weiss as WF Fafner in 2020.
Fafnir, playable character in Smite (video game)
Drain Fafnir, Geist Fafnir, Wizard Fafnir, Mirage Fafnir and Vanish Fafnir, are Beyblade Burst